The 1952–53 Illinois Fighting Illini men’s basketball team represented the University of Illinois at Urbana–Champaign.

Regular season
Under the leadership of Harry Combes and coming off consecutive third-place finishes in the NCAA Tournament, the Fighting Illini men's basketball program had become one of the most powerful in the nation.  The 1952-53 team returned one of the most dominant players in the NCAA, Johnny Kerr.  It also returned United Press honorable mention all-American guards Irv Bemoras and Jim Bredar.

Unfortunately the Illini would lose 4 conference games during the Big Ten season which would give them a second-place finish.  Three of the four losses came at the hands of ranked opponents.  The starting lineup included captain Jim Bredar and Irving Bemoras at guard, Clive Follmer and Max Hooper at the forward slot with Robert Peterson and, future hall of famer Johnny "Red" Kerr at the center position.  The team also included former University of Minnesota head coach Jim Dutcher.

Roster

Source

Schedule
												
Source																
												

|-
!colspan=12 style="background:#DF4E38; color:white;"| Non-Conference regular season

|-
!colspan=9 style="background:#DF4E38; color:#FFFFFF;"|Big Ten regular season

|-					

Bold Italic connotes conference game

Rankings

Player stats

Awards and honors

Irv Bemoras
Converse 2nd team All-American
Look Magazine 2nd team All-American
Helms 2nd team All-American
Associated Press Honorable Mention All-American
Team Most Valuable Player 
Jim Bredar
International News Service 2nd team All-American
Converse 2nd team All-American
Look Magazine 2nd team All-American
Helms 2nd team All-American
Associated Press 3rd team All-American
Johnny Kerr
Associated Press Honorable Mention All-American
International News Service Honorable Mention All-American
Converse Honorable Mention All-American
Clive Follmer
Big Ten Medal of Honor

Team players drafted into the NBA

Rankings

References

Illinois Fighting Illini
Illinois Fighting Illini men's basketball seasons
1952 in sports in Illinois
1953 in sports in Illinois